The Tettigoniinae are a subfamily of bush crickets or katydids, which contains hundreds of species in about twelve tribes.

Distribution
The greatest diversity is in the Palaearctic region and many of the familiar European species of bush crickets (e.g. in the genera Metrioptera, Pholidoptera, Platycleis and the type genus Tettigonia) are in this subfamily.  They are attributed to an ancient Gondwana fauna, which is reflected in the known distribution of the southern African genera, which are in turn related to Australian and North American genera in the tribe Nedubini (e.g. Neduba and Aglaothorax).  Extant genera are native to: the Americas (where they may be called shield-backed katydids), Australia, southern Africa, Europe (especially Mediterranean), and the Near East. The faunas of the Neotropics and Australia are more closely related to one other than to those of southern Africa and Madagascar (in tribe Arytropteridini), although the three faunas are related.

Tribes and genera 
In the Orthoptera Species File, the following are listed:

Arytropteridini 
Auth. Caudell, 1908
 Alfredectes Rentz, 1988
 Anarytropteris Uvarov, 1924
 Arytropteris Herman, 1874
 Ceresia Uvarov, 1928 - monotypic Ceresia pulchripes
 Namaquadectes Rentz, 1988
 Thoracistus Pictet, 1888
 Toliaridectes Hugel, 2019
 Transkeidectes Naskrecki, 1992
 Zuludectes Rentz, 1988

Ctenodecticini 
Auth. Caudell, 1908
 Ctenodecticus Bolívar, 1877
 Miramiola Uvarov, 1939

Decticini 
Auth. Herman, 1874 (synonyms Decticidae or Dectici Herman, 1874)
 Decticus Serville, 1831

Drymadusini 
Auth. Uvarov, 1924

 Afrodrymadusa Ramme, 1939
 Ammoxenulus Bei-Bienko, 1951
 Anadolua Ramme, 1939
 Anadrymadusa Karabag, 1961
 Anatlanticus Bei-Bienko, 1951
 Atlanticus Scudder, 1894
 Bergiola Stshelkanovtzev, 1910
 Bienkoxenus Cejchan, 1968
 Calopterusa Uvarov, 1942
 Ceraeocercus Uvarov, 1910
 Delodusa Stolyarov, 1994
 Drymadusa Stein, 1860
 Drymadusella Ramme, 1939
 Drymapedes Bei-Bienko, 1967
 Eulithoxenus Bei-Bienko, 1951
 Exodrymadusa Karabag, 1961
 Farsodecticus Mirzayans, 1991
 Ferganusa Uvarov, 1926
 Iranusa Uvarov, 1942
 Kansua Uvarov, 1933
 Leptodusa Stolyarov, 1994
 Lithodusa Bei-Bienko, 1951
 Lithoxenus Bei-Bienko, 1951
 Microdrymadusa Bei-Bienko, 1967
 Mixodusa Stolyarov, 1994
 Mongolodectes Bei-Bienko, 1951
 Novadrymadusa Demirsoy, Salman & Sevgili, 2002
 Paradrymadusa Herman, 1874
 Paratlanticus Ramme, 1939
 Pezodrymadusa Karabag, 1961
 Phytodrymadusa Ramme, 1939
 Ptosoproctus Shen, Yin & He, 2021
 Scotodrymadusa Ramme, 1939
 Sichuana Yin & Shen, 2020
 Tadzhikia Mishchenko, 1954
 Uvarovina Ramme, 1939
 Zagrosiella Mirzayans, 1991

Gampsocleidini 
Auth. Brunner von Wattenwyl, 1893
 Gampsocleis Fieber, 1852
 Uvarovites Tarbinsky, 1932 - monotypic U. inflatus (Uvarov, 1924) - mainland E. Asia

Glyphonotini 
Auth. Tarbinsky, 1932 (synonyms: Glyphonotinae Tarbinsky, 1932; Glyphontini)
 Chlorodectes Rentz, 1985
 Ectopistidectes Rentz, 1985
 Glyphonotus Redtenbacher, 1889
 Metaballus Herman, 1874

Nedubini 
Auth. Gorochov, 1988

 Aglaothorax Caudell, 1907
 Antipodectes Rentz, 1985
 Apteropedetes Rentz, 1979
 Barraza Koçak & Kemal, 2008
 Chinnandectes Rentz, 1985
 Dexerra Walker, 1869
 Falcidectes Rentz & Gurney, 1985
 Glenbalodectes Rentz, 1985
 Idionotus Scudder, 1894
 Ixalodectes Rentz, 1985
 Lanciana Walker, 1869
 Neduba Walker, 1869
 Oligodectes Rentz, 1985
 Oligodectoides Rentz, 1985
 Phymonotus Lightfoot, Weissman & Ueshima, 2011
 Platydecticus Chopard, 1951
 Platyproctidectes Rentz, 1985
 Rhachidorus Herman, 1874
 Throscodectes Rentz, 1985
 Xederra Ander, 1938
 Xyrdectes Rentz & Gurney, 1985

Onconotini 
Auth. Tarbinsky, 1940
 Onconotus Fischer von Waldheim, 1839

Pholidopterini 
Auth. Ramme, 1951
 Aparapholidoptera Çiplak, 2020
Apholidoptera Maran, 1953
 Eupholidoptera Maran, 1953
 Exopholidoptera Ünal, 1998
 Parapholidoptera Maran, 1953
 Pholidoptera Wesmaël, 1838
Spinopholidoptera Çiplak, 2020
 Uvarovistia Maran, 1953

Plagiostirini 
Auth. Storozhenko, 1994
 Plagiostira Scudder, 1876

Platycleidini 
Auth. Brunner von Wattenwyl, 1893

 Afghanoptera Ramme, 1952
 Amedegnatiana Massa & Fontana, 2011
 Anabrus Haldeman, 1852
 Anonconotus Camerano, 1878
 Antaxius Brunner von Wattenwyl, 1882
 Anterastes Brunner von Wattenwyl, 1882
 Ariagona Krauss, 1892
 Austrodectes Rentz, 1985
 Bicolorana Zeuner, 1941 
 e.g. Bicolorana bicolor
 Broughtonia Harz, 1969
 Bucephaloptera Ebner, 1923
 Chizuella Furukawa, 1950
 Clinopleura Scudder, 1894
 Decticita Hebard, 1939
 Decticoides Ragge, 1977
 Eobiana Bei-Bienko, 1949
 Eremopedes Scudder, 1897
 Festella Giglio-Tos, 1894
 Hermoniana Broza, Ayal & Pener, 2004
 Hypsopedes Bei-Bienko, 1951
 Idiostatus Pictet, 1888
 Inyodectes Rentz & Birchim, 1968
 Koroglus - monotypic  K. disparalatus Ünal, 2002
 Metrioptera Wesmaël, 1838 
 e.g. Metrioptera brachyptera
 Montana Zeuner, 1941
 Pachytrachis Uvarov, 1940
 Pediodectes Rehn & Hebard, 1916
 Peranabrus Scudder, 1894
 Petropedes Tinkham, 1972
 Platycleis Fieber, 1853
 Plicigastra Uvarov, 1940
 Pravdiniana Sergeev & Pokivajlov, 1992
 Psorodonotus Brunner von Wattenwyl, 1861
 Pterolepis Rambur, 1838
 Raggeana Pener, Broza & Ayal, 1971
 Rammeola Uvarov, 1934
 Rhacocleis Fieber, 1853
 Sardoplatycleis Massa & Fontana, 2011
 Roeseliana Zeuner, 1941 - formerly in Metrioptera
 Schizonotinus Ramme, 1948
 Sepiana Zeuner, 1941
 Sphagniana Zeuner, 1941
 Steiroxys Herman, 1874
 Tessellana Zeuner, 1941
 e.g. Tessellana tessellata
 Uludaghia Ramme, 1951
 Yersinella Ramme, 1933
 Zeuneriana Karsch, 1889

Tettigoniini 
Auth. Krauss, 1902

 Acrodectes Rehn & Hebard, 1920
 Amphiestris Fieber, 1853
 Apote Scudder, 1897
 Ateloplus Scudder, 1894
 Calliphona Krauss, 1892
 Capnobotes Scudder, 1897
 Cyrtophyllicus Hebard, 1908
 Elasmocercus Chopard, 1943
 Evergoderes Bolívar, 1936
 Hubbellia Hebard, 1927
 Hyphinomos Uvarov, 1921
 Medecticus Uvarov, 1912
 Nanodectes Rentz, 1985
 Platyoplus Tinkham, 1973
 Psalmatophanes Chopard, 1938
 Sureyaella Uvarov, 1934
 Tettigonia Linnaeus, 1758
 Thyreonotus Serville, 1838 including Thyreonotus corsicus
 Zacycloptera Caudell, 1907

Tribe incertae sedis 
 Bolua Ünal, 1999
 Dreuxia Chopard & Dreux, 1966
 Neogampsocleis Caudell, 1935

Examples and Gallery
The Mormon cricket, actually a katydid and member of this subfamily, has been known to cause extensive damage when it breeds in large numbers in cropland. 123 species are native to North America.

References

External links
 
 
Subfamily Tettigoniinae
Mormon Cricket

 
Orthoptera subfamilies